Thornton Hee (March 26, 1911 – October 30, 1988) was an American animator, director, and teacher. He taught character design and caricature.

Career 
Hee worked at Leon Schlesinger Productions from 1935–36 as a character designer. He designed many of the celebrity caricatures used in The CooCoo Nut Grove (1936) and The Woods Are Full of Cuckoos (1937). A 1936 Christmas card that he drew, featuring caricatures of the Schlesinger animators, was used to design the gremlins in the 1944 animated short Russian Rhapsody.

Hee joined Walt Disney Animation Studios around 1937. He is most recognized for directing the Dance of the Hours segment of Fantasia. He left after the strike, but returned to work there twice, from 1940 to 1946, and again from 1958 to 1961. Hee also worked for United Productions of America (1951 to 1958) and Terrytoons (1961 to 1963).

Hee was one of the co-founders, with Jack Hannah, of the Character Animation program at the California Institute of the Arts. He later served as chairman of the Film Arts Department.

Hee provided the illustrations during the opening credits of The Life of Riley television show of the 1950s.

Notes

External links
 
A Timely Letter From T. Hee''

1911 births
1988 deaths
American animators
American film directors
American animated film directors
Walt Disney Animation Studios people
Animators from Oklahoma
Artists from Oklahoma
Warner Bros. Cartoons people
Terrytoons people